Cradle Song is a 1994 Spanish drama film directed by José Luis Garci. The film was selected as the Spanish entry for Best Foreign Language Film at the 67th Academy Awards, but was not nominated.

Cast
 Fiorella Faltoyano as Madre Teresa
 Alfredo Landa as Don José
 María Massip as Madre Vicaria
 Diana Peñalver as Madre Juana de la Cruz
 Maribel Verdú as Teresa

See also
 List of submissions to the 67th Academy Awards for Best Foreign Language Film
 List of Spanish submissions for the Academy Award for Best Foreign Language Film

References

External links
 

1994 films
1994 drama films
1990s Spanish-language films
Spanish drama films
Spanish films based on plays
Films with screenplays by José Luis Garci
Films directed by José Luis Garci
1990s Spanish films